Felicity Carol Leydon-Davis (born 22 June 1994) is a New Zealand cricketer who currently plays for Otago. She took a five-wicket haul on her Women's One Day International (WODI) debut.

References

External links

1994 births
Living people
New Zealand women cricketers
New Zealand women One Day International cricketers
New Zealand women Twenty20 International cricketers
New Zealand expatriate sportspeople in England
New Zealand expatriate sportspeople in Australia
Cricketers from Hamilton, New Zealand
Northern Districts women cricketers
Otago Sparks cricketers
Queensland Fire cricketers
Devon women cricketers